The Achagua (also Achawa and Axagua) are an indigenous people of Colombia and Venezuela. At the time of the Spanish colonization of the Americas, their territory covered the present-day Venezuelan states of Bolívar, Guárico and Barinas. In the late twentieth century there were several hundred Achaguas remaining.

Municipalities belonging to Achagua territories

Culture 
Achagua people live in large villages. Clans live together in communal houses. Polygamy is commonplace. They farm crops, such as bitter cassava. They traditionally poison their arrows with curare.

There is a small town in Apure called Achaguas.

Language 
Achagua people speak the Achagua language, a Maipurean Arawakan language.

See also 

U'wa
Guayupe, Tegua

References

External links 
 Achagua artwork, National Museum of the American Indian

Circum-Caribbean tribes
Indigenous peoples in Colombia
Indigenous peoples in Venezuela